Jiangnan University (JiangnanU or JU) is a public research university located in Wuxi, Jiangsu, China. It is a National Key University funded by the Double First Class University Plan and former Project 211, and is directly administered by the Chinese Ministry of Education.

Previously known as the Wuxi University of Light Industry, Jiangnan University is renowned as the cradle and one of the major institutions of China's light industry. Biotechnology, chemical engineering, food science, mechanical engineering, textile engineering, fashion design, and industrial design are the most distinguished disciplines of the university.

According to the 2022 Academic Ranking of World Universities, Jiangnan University ranked 401st-500th among world universities on. Jiangnan University is regarded as one of the world's top "Food Science and Technology" research institutions. As of 2022, the "Food Science and Technology" program was ranked No.1 Globally by the Shanghai Ranking, and URAP ranking, and 3rd in the world by the U.S. News Rankings.

History
The private Jiangnan University, one source of JiangnanU, was founded in Wuxi in 1947 by Rong Desheng, the largest national capitalist in the Republic of China era.

In 1952, during restructuring of higher education happened after the establishment of the People's Republic of China, the engineering related departments of Nanjing University( stretches back to San Jiang Normal School which founded in 1902 in Nanjing and later renamed National Central University), merging engineering departments of private Jiangnan University and several other engineering departments of universities in east China area, including Fudan University, Wuhan University, Zhejiang University, etc. Later, they formed Nanjing Institute of Technology, now Southeast University in Nanjing.

In 1958, the Department of Food Technology of Nanjing Institute of Technology moved to Wuxi and established Wuxi Institute of Light Industry which was named Wuxi University of Light Industry in 1995.

In 2001, Jiangnan University was formed by the combination of Wuxi University of Light Industry, Jiangnan College and Wuxi Education College.

Campus
The newly completed university campus covers 208 hectares with floor space of 1.05 million square meters. It is located by Lake Li, an inner lake of Lake Tai and also a national scenic resort in the south of Wuxi. It was designed and built to demonstrate the concept of an "Eco-campus".

Schools 
Jiangnan University consists of 17 schools and offers 48 undergraduate programs with 9 disciplines including science, engineering, medicine, literature, economics, management, law, education and arts. Jiangnan University has 7 Post-doctoral Research Stations in the fields of Light Industry Technology and Engineering, Food Science and Technology, Chemical Engineering and Technology, Control Science and Engineering, Environment Engineering, Textile Engineering and Design. It is entitled to confer master's degrees in 58 programs, and doctoral degrees in 28 programs.

Southwest:

School of Food Science and Technology

School of Biotechnology

School of Chemical and Material Engineering

School of Pharmaceutical Sciences

Wuxi School of Medicine

Southeast:

School of Business

School of Law

School of Marxism

School of Foreign Studies

School of Artificial Intelligence and Computer Science

Northwest:

School of Textile and Clothing

School of Design

School of Internet of Things Engineering (incorporated by School of Communications and Control Engineering and School of Information Engineering)

School of Mechanical Engineering

School of Environmental and Civil Engineering

Northeast:

School of Science

School of Humanities and Education

Division of Sports

Rankings and reputation 
According to the 2022 Academic Ranking of World Universities, Jiangnan University ranked 401st-500th among world universities.Jiangnan University is regarded as one of the world's top "Food Science and Technology" research institutions. As of 2022, the "Food Science and Technology" program was ranked No.1 Globally by the Shanghai Ranking, and URAP ranking, and 3rd in the world by the U.S. News Rankings.

Research 
The school has devoted itself to the mission of making China an innovation-driven country. The school has taken a leadership role in founding the Collaborative Innovation Center for Food Safety and Nutrition, and has founded five "111 Plan" Base for Innovation and Talent Recruiting and 18 international joint laboratories.

Since 2012, the school has been awarded 7 State Scientific and Technological Progress Awards and State Technological Invention Awards, tied for 20th in China, and was ranked 17th in the Patent Award for Chinese Universities list in 2016. It is ranked 50th on the Chinese University Evaluation handbook, and is one of China's fastest growing universities.

Key research institutes
The National Key Lab of Food Science and Technology
The National Engineering Laboratory for Cereal Fermentation Technology
The National Engineering Research Centre for Function Food
Key Laboratory of Industrial Biotechnology, Ministry of Education
Key Laboratory of Carbohydrate Chemistry and Biotechnology, Ministry of Education
Key Laboratory of Synthetic and Biological Colloids, Ministry of Education
Key Laboratory of Science and Technology of Eco-Textile, Ministry of Education

Faculty
The university has 3393 faculty members, including 2137 full-time instructors. 63.8% of faculty holds a senior title, 68.9% has a doctoral degree, and 42.1% has more than one year of overseas experience.

The school has three academician of the Chinese Academy of Engineering, 14 "Thousand Talents Plan" awardees, 13 "Chang Jiang Scholars Program" distinguished professors, 5 National Science Fund for Distinguished Young Scholars awardees, five National Science Fund for Outstanding Scholars awardees, one "973 Program" chief scientist, eight "Ten Thousand Talent Program" awardees.

International Engagement 
The university has signed cooperation and exchange agreements with 190 universities and research institutions in 39 countries and regions, and 28.6% of the students have overseas exchange and exchange experience; it has built the world's first Confucius Institute with the theme of Chinese food culture in cooperation with the University of California, Davis.

Jiangnan University began to accept international students from 1964, and has cultivated students from more than 80 countries. The university specially establishes "President Scholarship", "Taihu Scholarship” and “New Student Scholarship” for international students. In 2010, the university recruited 25 self-enroll Chinese Government Scholarship students.

Doctoral Program for international students mainly includes: Food Science, Fermentation Engineering, Pharmaceutical Engineering and Technology, Textile Science and Engineering, Control Science and Control Engineering, Chemistry Engineering and Technology, Environment Engineering, Light Industry Machinery and Packaging Engineering, Product Design Theory and Technology, etc.

References

External links
Jiangnan University 

 
Universities and colleges in Jiangsu
Project 211
Education in Wuxi